The Tacoma City Council is the major governing body in the city of Tacoma, Washington. The City Council has one mayor and eight council members, who are elected to serve four-year terms. The City Council has the power to write the laws of the city, budget the city's finances, and make other decisions for the city. The City Council holds meetings on the first floor of the Tacoma Municipal Building.

History
The current system for the Tacoma City Council was established in 1952. Prior to this date, Tacoma's government consisted of elected commissioners, who frequently plagued the city with corruption. Voters chose to replace the old system with a city council (including the mayor) to pass laws and a city manager to enforce them, also known as the Council–manager system. The council–manager government remains Tacoma's governmental structure today.

Public meeting controversy 

Under the Open Public Meetings Act of 1971, Washington state law requires Tacoma City Council meetings to be open to the public. In 1999, Cheryl Miller sued the Council for voting down her application to serve on the Tacoma City Planning Commission during executive session, during which doors were closed to the public. The Washington Supreme Court agreed with Miller. In Miller vs. City of Tacoma, the court ruled that in executive session, the Council could deliberate and "evaluate" nominees, but a vote choosing between nominees overstepped the boundaries of an evaluation. Even though the vote was not a formal one, it still violated the public's right to transparency. Miller was compensated only for her attorney fees and court costs as the Supreme Court ruled that the council members did not break the law intentionally.

This issue of public transparency has not been fully resolved. Similar situations have occurred where the Tacoma City Council allegedly held informal votes on candidates in secret, such as a 2010 executive session to fill two vacancies on the Council. The city settled a lawsuit challenging the 2010 discussion.

Current members
The current members of the Tacoma City Council as of November 2021 are listed below.
 Victoria Woodards, Mayor
 John Hines, Position 1
 Sarah Rumbaugh, Position 2
 Keith Blocker, Position 3
 Catherine Ushka, Position 4
 Joe Bushnell, Position 5
 Kiara Daniels, Position 6 
 Olgy Diaz, Position 7
 Kristina Walker, Position 8

Notable former members 

 Marilyn Strickland
 Bill Baarsma
 Doug Sutherland
 Harold Moss

References

Government of Tacoma, Washington
Washington city councils